The Asia/Oceania Zone is one of the three zones of regional Davis Cup competition in 2010.

In the Asia/Oceania Zone there are four different groups in which teams compete against each other to advance to the next group.

Participating teams

Seeds
1.

2.

3.

4.

Remaining Nations

Draw

 relegated to Group II in 2011.
 and  advance to World Group Play-off.

First round matches

Australia vs. Chinese Taipei

Japan vs. Philippines

China vs. Uzbekistan

Kazakhstan vs. South Korea

Second round matches

Australia vs. Japan

China vs. Kazakhstan

First round play-offs

Chinese Taipei vs. Philippines

South Korea vs. Uzbekistan

Second round play-offs

Philippines vs. South Korea

External links
 Davis Cup draw details

Asia Oceania Zone Group I
Davis Cup Asia/Oceania Zone